"Batdance" is a song by American musician Prince, from the 1989 Batman soundtrack. Helped by the film's popularity, the song reached number one in the US, becoming Prince's fourth American number-one single and his first number-one hit since "Kiss" in 1986.

Song development
"Batdance" was a last-minute replacement for a brooding track titled "Dance with the Devil", which Prince felt was too dark. Incidentally, although "Dance with the Devil" remains unreleased, some of the lyrics appear in the album's liner notes.

"Batdance" is almost two songs in one - a chaotic, mechanical dance beat that changes gears into a slinky, funky groove before changing back for the song's conclusion (except on the single version in which it eliminates the guitar solo before the middle section, then goes straight to the mechanical Joker laughter from the end of the movie and an earlier movie soundbyte of Michael Keaton saying "Stop"). The track is an amalgam of many musical ideas of Prince's at the time. Elements from at least seven songs (some unreleased) were incorporated into "Batdance": "200 Balloons", "We Got the Power", "House in Order", "Rave Unto the Joy Fantastic" (later released on the album Rave Un2 the Joy Fantastic), "The Future", and "Electric Chair". Some of these were mere snippets, and other segments showed up only in remixes of the track. The song was also loaded with dialog samples from the film, making it one of the earlier songs where Prince dabbled in sampling.

Critical reception
Jerry Smith from Music Week said, "With a mess of samples thrown in, it settles into a delicious funky groove that ends too soon. Sure to be massive and not only in Gotham City, Batfreaks!" Mike Soutar from Smash Hits wrote, "Granted, he sings on a bit of it, but for the most part all you can hear is that jing-jing-ka-jinga-jing guitar noise that Prince has been putting on most of his records since "Kiss". Over and above that there are what presumably are cut-ups of dialogue from the film, mad laughter and some demented screaming. Very odd indeed."

Music video
The song's accompanying music video, directed by Albert Magnoli and choreographed by Barry Lather, featured dancers costumed as multiple Batmen, Jokers and Vicki Vales. Prince appears as a costumed character in face paint known as "Gemini", with one side of his face representing the Joker (evil) and the other, Batman (good). The video starts with Prince receiving a transmission from Gemini where he makes a face. The Batman and Jokers alternate dance sections, while Prince (as both himself and Gemini) sings. The video ends with Gemini hitting a detonator, exploding an electric chair (referenced in the song), and Prince (actually Michael Keaton's voice) saying "Stop" as the video abruptly ends. The video also features one Vicki Vale wearing a black dress with the words "All this and brains too", a reference to The Dark Knight Returns by Frank Miller, in which a female news presenter wears a top with the same slogan.

Gemini is Prince's astrological sign, and is a reference to the duality in his music. "Gemini" would also make an appearance in the "Partyman" video, but this time the costume would be all-Joker. The video earned Prince a 1990 Soul Train Music Award nomination for Best R&B/Soul Music Video, and nomination for Best Video From a Film from the MTV Video Music Awards of the same year.

B-side
The B-side to the "Batdance" is "200 Balloons", which was recorded for the film and serves as the musical blueprint for the main portion of "Batdance". The song was rejected for the film by Tim Burton and replaced with "Trust". The lyrics of "200 Balloons" reference the scene which it was created for to a greater degree than the replacement track, which is only connected to the scene by the Joker asking "Who do you trust?" after the song ends. Prince did little more than replace the lyrics of "200 Balloons" in its transition into "Batdance". Only musical portions survived the transition, but full lyrics showed up in "The Batmix" (turn your head to the east, I be coming from the west). "200 Balloons" also contains samples of "House in Order" and "Rave Unto the Joy Fantastic"; the latter was another song submitted for inclusion in the movie, but rejected (it was replaced by "Partyman").

Remixes
The 7-inch edit of the song is basically the album version without the guitar solo and the up-tempo part near the end.

The 12-inch vinyl and CD Maxi versions of the single included two remixes of "Batdance" that were done by Mark Moore and William Orbit, "The Batmix" and "Vicki Vale Mix". "The Batmix" focuses on the chaotic "rock" section of "Batdance", and is supplemented with electronic distortion and sampling of voices, instruments, and larger excerpts of Prince's then-unreleased "Rave Un2 the Joy Fantastic". The "Vicki Vale Mix" is an extension of the middle part of "Batdance", which includes dialogue between Bruce Wayne and Vicki Vale. In addition to "200 Balloons", the CD Maxi single (9-21257-2) features both of these remixes.

In November 2013, an unreleased mix leaked online that featured a rap by Big Daddy Kane. The remix was done by John Luongo, who confirmed its existence. According to Luongo, the reason for the remix being unreleased was that Warner Bros. Records didn't like it because it was "too different" and refused its release, while Prince was pleased with the outcome.

A bootleg copy of an "original version" mix exists, which runs 8 minutes 47 seconds long; this iteration features all of the sections present in the album/12" version, but with extended instrumental sections and added vocal samples throughout, notably reincorporating more samples and cues from "200 Balloons"/"House in Order" and "Rave Unto the Joy Fantastic", as well as an added slowed down funk section between the Joker's "And where is the Batman?" sample and the guitar solo section as they appear on the final track; the "Vicki Vale" section is the only part wholly unaltered from its final iteration.

Personnel
 Prince – lead vocals and various instruments

Track listings
 7-inch single
 "Batdance" (edit) – 4:06
 "200 Balloons" – 5:05

 12-inch / CD single
 "Batdance" – 6:13
 "200 Balloons" – 5:05

 12-inch / CD maxi single
 "Batdance" (The Batmix) – 7:15
 "Batdance" (Vicky Vale mix) – 5:55
 "200 Balloons" – 5:05

 12-inch promo
 "Batdance" (The Batmix) – 7:15
 "Batdance" (The Batmix radio edit) – 4:09
 "Batdance" (Vicky Vale mix) – 5:55
 "Batdance" (Vicky Vale mix radio edit) – 4:13

References in popular media
 Hot Chip's video for their 2008 song "Ready for the Floor" is a homage to Prince's "Batdance" video. The group's founder, Joe Goddard, explained: "'Batdance' was the first video I ever saw. [Prince's Batman music videos] had good visual ideas". This was Hot Chip's second tribute to Prince; in 2003 the band released an EP titled Down with Prince.
 Sir Mix-a-Lot sampled the "Vicki Vale" part of "Batdance" for the song "Beepers", from his 1989 album Seminar.
 Comedy Bang Bang host Scott Aukerman has said that "Batdance" is his favorite song, on multiple occasions.
 The song was used for a dance/fight sequence in Mukul S. Anand's 1991 film Hum.

Charts

Weekly charts

Year-end charts

Certifications

References

 Uptown: The Vault – The Definitive Guide to the Musical World of Prince: Nilsen Publishing 2004, 

Prince (musician) songs
1989 singles
1989 songs
Batman music
Batman (1989 film series)
Billboard Hot 100 number-one singles
Cashbox number-one singles
Dance-pop songs
European Hot 100 Singles number-one singles
Number-one singles in New Zealand
Number-one singles in Switzerland
Number-one singles in Norway
RPM Top Singles number-one singles
Song recordings produced by Prince (musician)
Songs about dancing
Songs written by Prince (musician)
Warner Records singles